Sole and the Skyrider Band is an alternative hip hop quartet based in Denver, Colorado.

The band consists of rapper Tim Holland a.k.a. Sole, producer Bud Berning a.k.a. Skyrider, multi-instrumentalist William Ryan Fritch, and drummer John Wagner.

The band has released three albums on Anticon, Fake Four Inc and Equinox Records.

History
In 2010, Sole and the Skyrider Band toured across the United States with Ceschi Ramos and Dark Time Sunshine.

URB premiered the video for Factor's remix of the song "Mr. Insurgent" from their second album, Plastique, on March 1, 2011.

Sole and the Skyrider Band released their third album, Hello Cruel World, on Fake Four Inc in 2011. The band toured across the United States in the year.

Discography
Studio albums
 Sole and the Skyrider Band (2007)  
 Plastique (2009) 
 Hello Cruel World (2011)

Remix albums
 Sole and the Skyrider Band Remix LP (2009)

EPs
 Battlefields (2009)
 The Challenger EP (2011)

Singles
 "Hello Cruel World" (2011)

References

External links
 Sole and the Skyrider Band on Fake Four Inc
 Sole and the Skyrider Band on Equinox Records

Anticon
American hip hop groups